Nelli Alexeyevna Korbukova (née Yefremova; ; 3 June 1962 – 29 April 2019) was a Soviet sprint canoer who competed in the 1980s. She has won six silver medals at the ICF Canoe Sprint World Championships: one each in the K-1 500 m (1985) and K-2 500m (1986) and four in the K-4 500 m (1982, 1983, 1985, 1986) events; as well as a bronze in K-2 5000 m (1990).

References

1962 births
2019 deaths
Russian female canoeists
Soviet female canoeists
ICF Canoe Sprint World Championships medalists in kayak